Surkhachi (Kaitag and Dargwa: Цӏурхачи) is a rural locality (a selo) in Akhmedkentsky Selsoviet, Kaytagsky District, Republic of Dagestan, Russia. The population was 455 as of 2010. There are 13 streets.

Geography 
Surkhachi is located 14 km northwest of Madzhalis (the district's administrative centre) by road. Iraki and Zilbachi are the nearest rural localities.

Geography 
Akhmedkent is the nearest rural locality.

Nationalities 
Dargins live there.

References 

Rural localities in Kaytagsky District